The 2000 WNBA season was the fourth season for the Phoenix Mercury. They made the playoffs for the first time in two years, but were swept in the first round to the Los Angeles Sparks. It was the last time Phoenix were in the playoffs until the 2007 season.

Offseason
Edna Campbell and Toni Foster were both picked up by the Seattle Storm in the 2000 WNBA Expansion Draft.

WNBA Draft

Trades

Regular season

Season standings

Season schedule

Playoffs

Player stats

References

Phoenix Mercury seasons
Phoenix
Phoenix Mercury